NHLA may be:
National Hispanic Leadership Agenda
National Hardwood Lumber Association
New Hampshire Liberty Alliance
New Hampshire Library Association, professional association for librarians in New Hampshire